Oksana Vasilyevna Lyapina (born 28 April 1980 in Armavir, Russian SFSR) is a Russian artistic gymnast who represented Russia at the 1996 Summer Olympics.

Career 
Lyapina competed in the 1995 Junior European Championships and helped her team win gold.

In 1996, she competed at the Olympic Games, along with Rozalia Galiyeva and Svetlana Khorkina. Although first in the compulsory round, they ultimately won silver in the team event. They were disappointed, feeling that they had deserved gold. Russia had a tough time focusing due partly to the American crowd in Atlanta, whose loud cheering distracted them many times - resulting in many falls and wobbles. Lyapina fell from the beam.

After the Olympics, Lyapina won some of her first individual medals but an injury prevented her from proper training and competing, so she failed to make the 1997 World Championships.

Competitive history

See also 
 List of Olympic female gymnasts for Russia

References

External links

1980 births
Living people
Russian female artistic gymnasts
Olympic gymnasts of Russia
Gymnasts at the 1996 Summer Olympics
Olympic silver medalists for Russia
People from Armavir, Russia
Olympic medalists in gymnastics
Medalists at the 1996 Summer Olympics
Sportspeople from Krasnodar Krai